Steven F. Marino (born March 24, 1989, in Detroit, Michigan) is a Republican member of the Michigan House of Representatives. He is serving in his third term and represents the 24th District.

Marino and spent much of his early life in nearby Harrison Township. Marino attended L’Anse Creuse High School and Michigan State University, where he graduated with degrees in Economics, Public Policy and Public Administration, and Political Theory and Constitutional Democracy. In 2014, Marino was as a Macomb County commissioner.

2016 election 
Anthony G. Forlini, the representative of District 24 did not seek-reelection because of term limit restrictions. Steve Marino, 27 at the time, secured more than 75% (4,991) of the 6,274 votes cast in the August 2 Republican primary election for the position, securing his nomination. His opponent, Dana Camphous-Peterson, ran unopposed in the Democratic primary. In the November 8 election, Marino received 23,968 votes (55.07%) while Camphous-Peterson received 19,553 votes (44.93%).

Marino gained negative media attention in 2016 after Michigan Democrats released a series of short audio recordings of Marino telling a series of fabricated stories to Democratic activists who he believed to be constituents, including one which Jewish news organizations characterized as antisemitic in nature. Marino retracted his statements and apologized stating the stories were "Lansing urban legends" and he "was just trying to illustrate some of the silliness" that took place in the state's capital.

In other secretly taped recordings, Michigan Democrats alleged that Marino defended outsourcing US jobs abroad to nations with fewer labor regulations; "Its easier for us just to move our plant to India...where materials are 1/100th of the cost and we can have people 10 and 12 years old working." While liberal organizations criticized the comments, alleging that they constituted support of child labor, Marino stated his words were taken out of context, and he was merely "discussing the tragedy of outsourcing American jobs overseas."

The recordings played a major part in Marino's 2016 election bid.

2018 election 
Marino ran unopposed in the Republican primary, as did Laura Winn in the Democratic primary. In the November 6 election, Marino received 21,391votes (55.54%), while his opponent, Winn received 17,125 votes (44.46%).

2021 investigation
In 2021, amid Michigan State Police investigations into allegations of domestic abuse against Marino by Democratic Representative Mari Manoogian, House Speaker Jason Wentworth removed Marino from his committee assignments, including the Commerce and Tourism Committee where he served as chair and the Local Government and Municipal Finance Committee.

References 

Living people
Republican Party members of the Michigan House of Representatives
1989 births
Politicians from Detroit
Michigan State University alumni
21st-century American politicians